Isabella Dunwill is an Australian actress best known for her role in iconic Australian soap opera Neighbours.

Initially signing on for a two-episode role as Geri Hallett, she was a recurring cast member between 1998 and 2001. Before this she had small parts in various Australian television shows, including Frontline and Horace and Tina.

After leaving Neighbours, Dunwill took roles in Australian television dramas Stingers and The Secret Life of Us. She has since studied at the Australian National Institute of Dramatic Art (graduating in 2003) and has had roles both on stage and on screen, including What the Butler Saw directed by Jim Sharman, for Belvoir St.Theatre Company B, feature film (WIL), independent short film (A Black and White World) and television series Thank God You're Here.

Dunwill's credits include: 
For television: Carla Cametti P.D., Satisfaction, Thank God You're Here, Neighbours, The Secret Life of Us, Stingers, Horace and Tina, Halifax FP, and Frontline.

Her film credits include WIL, A Black and White World and in the AFI winning short, The Projectionist.

On stage she appeared in Jim Sharman's production of What the Butler Saw (Belvoir Street, NSW), the Bell Shakespeare Company's Actors at Work tour 2007, Scarlett O’Hara at the Crimson Parrott workshop Melbourne Theatre Company, Denise Baudu in The Department Store at the Old Fitzroy Theatre. (NSW), Cassandra in Theatre @ Risk's Requiem for the 20th Century, and La Mama's The Devil's Dictionary.

Dunwill was also a Motion Capture artist for the feature film Constantine and various other popular computer games including Stalker.

She is the lead voice of Polvina the octopus sea princess in the animated children's series Sea Princesses on Channel 7, the voice of Nina in the animated television series Pixel Pinkie on Channel 9 and the voice of Amy, the blue dressed teddy bear in the animated 3D television series Bananas in Pyjamas.

References

External links 
 
 Interview

Living people
Australian stage actresses
Australian soap opera actresses
Australian film actresses
Year of birth missing (living people)